Zubova Polyana (Zubu) is an urban locality (a work settlement) and the administrative center of Zubovo-Polyansky District of the Republic of Mordovia, Russia. As of the 2010 Census, its population was 10,338.

Administrative and municipal status
Within the framework of administrative divisions, Zubova Polyana serves as the administrative center of Zubovo-Polyansky District. As an administrative division, the work settlement of Zubova Polyana, together with four rural localities, is incorporated within Zubovo-Polyansky District as Zubova Polyana Work Settlement. As a municipal division, Zubova Polyana Work Settlement is incorporated within Zubovo-Polyansky Municipal District as Zubovo-Polyanskoye Urban Settlement.

References

Notes

Sources

External links
Unofficial website of Zubova Polyana 



Urban-type settlements in Mordovia
Zubovo-Polyansky District